Line 2 of the Shenyang Metro is a rapid transit line running from north to south Shenyang. It was opened on January 9, 2012 and is currently 31.61 km long with 26 stations.

Opening timeline

Stations (north to south)

References

02
Railway lines opened in 2012
2012 establishments in China